The Labor Party (PT; also known as the Workers Party) is a political party in Mexico. It was founded on 8 December 1990. The party is currently led by Alberto Anaya.

History

The party first participated in federal elections in 1991, but it failed to win 1.5 percent of the vote (the amount necessary to be recognized as a national party). In 1994, Cecilia Soto became the presidential candidate.

In 1998 the PT allied with the larger Democratic Revolution Party (PRD) for the first time in the state of Zacatecas. In the 2000 elections, the party took part in the PRD-led Alliance for the Good of All. As part of the Alliance, it won 7 seats in the Chamber of Deputies and 1 seat in the Senate.

The PT ran separately from the PRD in the 2003 elections for the Chamber of Deputies. The party won 2.4 percent of the popular vote and 6 out of 500 seats in the Chamber of Deputies.

In November 2005, the PT endorsed the PRD's candidate for President, Andrés Manuel López Obrador for the July 2006 elections. In these elections the party won 12 out of 500 seats in the Chamber of Deputies and 3 out of 128 Senators.

In October 2006, the PT further allied itself with the PRD and the Convergence Party to form the Broad Progressive Front (FAP for its Spanish initials), which was granted the register by the Federal Electoral Institute.

Following the elections of 2018, the PT became the third-largest political party in the Chamber of Deputies with 61, after Morena with 191 and PAN with 81. Political maneuvering briefly established PRI as the third force in August 2020, although it later turned out that PT and PRI were tied with 46 seats each after doubtful PRD deputy defections in favor of PRI

2012 Mexican general election
In 2012 the PT supported PRD presidential candidate Andrés Manuel López Obrador.

2018 Mexican general election

The 2018 Mexican general election was the fifth presidential election PT had participated in. Its candidate for the Presidency was Andrés Manuel López Obrador as PT formed a coalition with left-wing National Regeneration Movement (MORENA) and right-wing Social Encounter Party (PES).

Background
On 24 June 2017, the PT approved to stand for election in 2018 in an electoral alliance with MORENA, however the coalition was not officially registered before the National Electoral Institute, the electoral authorities of the country. From MORENA, the alliance was facilitated as a result of the decline of the PT candidate Óscar González Yáñez, who resigned his candidacy requesting the vote in favor of Delfina Gómez Álvarez, standard-bearer in the state elections of the State of Mexico in 2017.

At first, there was speculation about the possibility of a front grouping all the leftist parties: MORENA, PRD, PT and Citizens' Movement (MC). However, Andrés Manuel López Obrador rejected any kind of agreement due to political differences, especially after the elections in the State of Mexico, when the candidates of the PRD and MC continued with their campaigns refusing to support the candidate of MORENA. At the end of November 2017, the leaders of MORENA and the PES announced that they were in talks to form a possible alliance. In this sense, Hugo Eric Flores Cervantes, President of PES, said, "We don't negotiate with the PRI, we have two options, go alone or with MORENA."

Confirmation
On December 13, the coalition between Morena, the PT and the PES was formalized under the name Juntos Haremos Historia (English: Together we will make history). Following the signing of the agreement, Andrés Manuel López Obrador was appointed as a pre-candidate for the three political formations. It is a partial coalition that will promote López Obrador as a presidential candidate and, with respect to the legislative elections: MORENA will have to choose candidates in 150 federal electoral districts and 32 districts to the Senate; 75 deputies and 16 senators for PT and 75 deputies and 16 senators for the PES.

The alliance has received criticism as it is a coalition between two leftist parties (MORENA and the PT) with a formation related to the evangelical right (PES). In response, the national president of MORENA, Yeidckol Polevnsky, mentioned that her party believes in inclusion, joint work to "rescue Mexico" and that they will continue to defend human rights, while Hugo Eric Flores Cervantes, national president of the PES, mentioned that "the only possibility of real change in our country is the one headed by Andrés Manuel López Obrador "and that his party had decided to put" on the right side of history."

Electoral history

Presidential elections

Congressional elections

Chamber of Deputies

Due to a number of party changes among legislators, in September 2020 PT became tied for the third most biggest political party in the Chamber, after MORENA and PAN, but tied with PRI, with 34 seats each.

Senate elections

References

 
Political parties in Mexico
1990 establishments in Mexico